DWVA (1170 AM) is a relay station of the Voice of America. The station's transmitter facilities are located in the Poro Point Freepoint Zone, Brgy. Poro, San Fernando, La Union.

References

Radio stations in La Union
Radio stations established in 1953